Oru Vadakkan Selfie is a 2015 Indian Malayalam-language road-comedy film directed by G. Prajith and scripted by Vineeth Sreenivasan. The film features Nivin Pauly, Manjima Mohan, Aju Varghese, Neeraj Madhav and Vineeth Sreenivasan. The music was composed by Shaan Rahman. It was released on 27 March to positive reviews, and became one of the biggest grossing Malayalam films of the year. Some news media and the Kerala Film Producers Association called it the first successful Malayalam film of 2015. This movie marks the debut of Manjima Mohan as an actress in Malayalam movie; earlier, she played a child in films including Priyam and Sundara Purushan.

Plot 
Umesh Manohar is a 21-year-old carefree engineering student who has 42 back papers to clear. His close pals are Shaji and Thankaprasad. Wanting to find a quick way to earn money and fame, he decides to try his hand at movies, and wants to assist none other than the renowned South-Indian director Gautham Vasudev Menon. Shaji suggests that Umesh make a short film and upload it on the internet, but the result is utter failure, after losing the camera in an accident. Umesh's father orders him to help him to run his small shop. To avoid such a bleak future, Umesh catches the next train to Chennai from his home town of Thalassery, Kannur. On the train, he sees Daisy, his neighbour back home. Umesh tries to woo Daisy throughout the journey but miserably fails. He lies to his friends that they are having an affair, tricks her into posing for a selfie with him, and sends it to Shaji.

After spending six days in Chennai, realizing that he is not cut out for the struggle to enter the film industry, he returns to his town in Thalassery, where he finds a slew of people waiting for his return. He learns that his hometown is hot with news of his elopement with Daisy. The selfie clicked by him had created a big problem among his family and neighbours. He finds out that Shaji had been the one who told them. He returns to Chennai immediately with Shaji to find her and prove his innocence, where they meet a private detective named Jack Tracker, with whom he had fought earlier with when chasing Daisy.

With the help of Jack, Umesh finds Daisy, and later, it is revealed that she is in love with a man called Harinarayan and wants to marry him. She also tells them that she had known him and communicated through social media like Facebook and emails but had never met him. Later, Umesh, Daisy, Shaji, and Jack set out to find Hari, and they travel to his hometown Pazhani. The gang later manages to go to Hari's house with the help of a farmer, who is also a Keralite. It is revealed that Hari had committed suicide a year before, as his friend and business partner John Mathew Bhaskar had cheated him in their business venture. John then used Hari's online accounts to cheat others.

Jack then reveals that he is an officer from Tamil Nadu CBCID (Crime Branch Crime Investigation Department) economic investigation wing, his real name is Nivin, and he did all this to find the brains behind the online money fraud. He also says that the true intention of the guy in the Internet is to cheat young women and steal their money. After the set of confusions being cleared, Umesh, Daisy, and Shaji go back to Kerala. A few months later, Umesh meets Nivin at a resort, where he says Umesh that the cybercell group had found the real culprit, John. Nivin then lets Umesh to vent out his anger on John for cheating innocent girls as what he did to Daisy. Umesh is then shown walking to a nearby table and asking whether the man sitting there is John. The movie ends with the man answering yes and Umesh smashing a bottle on his head.

Cast

 Nivin Pauly as Umesh Manohar
 Manjima Mohan as Daisy George
 Vineeth Sreenivasan as Jack Tracker/Nivin
 Aju Varghese as Shaji
 Neeraj Madhav as Thankaprasad (Thankamma)
 Vijayaraghavan as Manoharan 
 Sreelakshmi as Umesh's mother
 P. Sukumar as George, Daisy's father
 Maala Parvathi as Daisy's mother
 Revathy Sivakumar as Umesh's sister
 Bhagath Manuel as Shylesh
 Santhosh Keezhattoor as Mohan
 Harikrishnan as Surya Narayan

 Kottayam Pradeep as Shaji's father
 Master Gaurav Menon as Mohan's son
 Geevarghese Eappen 
 Anwar Shareef
 Sharath (uncredited role)
 Vineeth Kumar as himself (guest appearance)
 Bobby Simha as John Mathew Bhaskar (guest appearance)
 Unni Mukundan as Harinarayan (photos only)
 Ramesh Thilak (guest appearance)
 Darshana Das as Model (Neelambalin song sequence)

Reception

Filmibeat gave a rating of 3/5 and said "A hilarious entertainer for this Vishu season, which will make you laugh your heart out". Malayala Manorama gave a rating of 3.25/5. The Times of India mentions it to be "worth a watch for the performance of its vibrant cast and many moments of wit they pull off effortlessly" and awards a rating of 3/5 stars. The New Indian Express labeled it as "A Good-humoured Mass Selfie". International Business Times rated 3.5/5 stars and called it "A hilarious flick from Nivin Pauly-Aju Varghese team" and concluded "Overall, Oru Vadakkan Selfie is worth your time and money if you are looking ahead for a fun-filled day".

There have been announcements about remaking the film in Tamil, Telugu, Hindi, and Kannada. The remake rights for some of the languages has been sold while discussions regarding the others are progressing.

Box office 
Oru Vadakkan Selfie had what the IB Times called an "overwhelming start" in its first weekend, which resulted in many exhibitors increasing the number of screenings for the film. KFPA called the film as the "first super hit of 2015". 
The film stayed in the fifth position in its sixth weekend, owing to release of new films. Suresh Shenoy stated that the Vishu festival season of 2015 had "turned out to be a dampener except for the continuing rush for Oru Vadakkan Selfie".

The gross collection is estimated as over ₹25 crore. The film ran over 100 days and more in 24 releasing centres.

Soundtrack

The film's score and soundtrack are composed by Shaan Rahman. Song lyrics were written by Vineeth Sreenivasan, Manu Manjith and Anu Elizabeth Jose.

References

External links
 Official Facebook page
 

2015 films
Films scored by Shaan Rahman
2010s Malayalam-language films
Indian comedy thriller films
Malayalam films remade in other languages
Films shot in Thalassery
Films shot in Chennai